The 2006 Boise State Broncos football team represented Boise State University in the 2006 NCAA Division I FBS football season. The Broncos won the Western Athletic Conference (WAC) championship with an undefeated 12–0 regular-season record (8–0 in the WAC), their second unbeaten regular season in the past three years. This was also Boise State's fifth consecutive season with at least a share of the WAC title, and the fourth in that period in which they went unbeaten in conference play. They became only the second team from outside the Bowl Championship Series (BCS) to play in a BCS bowl game when they faced Oklahoma in the 2007 Fiesta Bowl, defeating the Sooners in a dramatic thriller.

The Broncos completed the first undefeated and untied season in school history with a 43–42 overtime win over the Sooners. The Broncos led most of the game, but fell behind late in the fourth quarter when quarterback Jared Zabransky threw an interception that was returned for an Oklahoma touchdown. They tied the game on a 50-yard hook and lateral play that ended in a touchdown with 7 seconds left. In the overtime, Sooners star running back Adrian Peterson scored a touchdown on the first play of Oklahoma's possession. Zabransky led the Broncos on a touchdown drive, capped off by a trick play in which backup receiver Vinny Peretta connected with tight end Derek Schouman on a fourth-down pass. They then gambled for the win on a two-point conversion, and tried another trick play. The Broncos ran a play very similar to the Statue of Liberty play, with Zabransky looking toward three receivers before handing the ball off behind his back to star running back Ian Johnson, who ran into the end zone untouched for the win. (The play would later be named the 2nd greatest highlight of all time in a 2008 ESPN Sportscenter poll behind Mike Eruzione's goal against the Soviets in the 1980 Miracle on Ice)

Due to Florida's 41–14 thrashing of previously unbeaten Ohio State in the BCS National Championship Game, the Broncos ended the season as the only undefeated team in NCAA Division I football, as no other team in Division I-AA (officially known as the "Football Championship Subdivision") finished undefeated (Three teams in lower divisions finished unbeaten: Grand Valley State in Division II, Mount Union in Division III, and Sioux Falls in NAIA.)

The Broncos play their home games at Bronco Stadium, most famous for its blue artificial turf surface, often referred to as the "Smurf-turf."

Previous season
Boise State finished the 2005 regular season with a 9–3 record. The Broncos' 7–1 conference record was good enough for a share of the title with Nevada. They ended their season with a 21-27 loss to Boston College in the MPC Computers Bowl on their home field in Boise to finish the season at 9–4. After the season, head coach Dan Hawkins left to take over the head coaching vacancy at Colorado, with offensive coordinator Chris Petersen taking his place.

Pre-season
The 2006 Broncos were an overwhelming favorite in the league's Preseason Media Poll to win the WAC title. They returned more starters than any other team in Division I FBS football—nine on offense and nine on defense, as well as their placekicker and punter. Among the returning starters was quarterback Jared Zabransky, whose 20 wins in the previous two seasons was the most by any returning quarterback in Division I FBS.

Pre-season awards
Korey Hall
Dick Butkus Award watch list

Ian Johnson
Walter Camp Award watch list
Doak Walker Award watch list

Jared Zabransky
Maxwell Award watch list
Davey O'Brien Award watch list

During the season
The Broncos started the season unranked in both the Coaches Poll or the AP Poll, and would not enter the polls until they had won their first three games. They steadily rose in the rankings mainly on the strength of an offense that finished the regular season second in scoring. The keys to their offense were running back Ian Johnson, who was the nation's leading scorer and second in rushing yards per game, and Zabransky, eighth in passing efficiency. Due to their threats on both the ground and in the air, they were one of only two teams in the country to rush and pass for over 200 yards per game (the other being Oklahoma State). In a more obscure statistic, they led the country in percentage of fourth-down conversions, converting 15 of 19 attempts.

The Broncos played five bowl-bound teams during the season—Oregon State, their only opponent from one of the six BCS conferences; Utah; and conference rivals Hawaii, San Jose State, and Nevada. Four out of five of these teams won their bowl game. The only loser, Nevada, lost by one point. Notably, they put a 42-14 defeat on an Oregon State team that would later in the season end the 38-game regular-season winning streak of USC.

Postseason awards
Chris Petersen
Paul "Bear" Bryant Award winner
AFCA Region 4 Coach of the Year
Eddie Robinson Coach of the Year finalist

Korey Hall
WAC Defensive Player of the Year
Lott Trophy quarterfinalist

Ian Johnson
Doak Walker Award semifinalist
Walter Camp Award final watchlist

Jared Zabransky
Maxwell Award semifinalist
Davey O'Brien Award semifinalist
Fiesta Bowl Most Valuable Player
Cover athlete of NCAA Football 08 video game

2007 Espy Awards
Best Game - 2007 Fiesta Bowl
Best Play - Fiesta Bowl Statue of Liberty

Schedule

Rankings

Roster

References

Boise State
Boise State Broncos football seasons
Western Athletic Conference football champion seasons
Fiesta Bowl champion seasons
College football undefeated seasons
Boise State Broncos football